Chan Sze-man (born 3 July 1930), better known by his stage name Ku Feng, is a Hong Kong actor.

Background
He studied in Beijing, and has appeared in hundreds of films, many of which were produced by the Shaw Brothers Studio.

Filmography

Film

Television series

References

External links
Guk Feng at TigerCinema.com
Guk Fung at LoveHKFilm.com

1930 births
TVB actors
Hong Kong male film actors
Living people
Hong Kong male television actors
Male actors from Shanghai
20th-century Hong Kong male actors
21st-century Hong Kong male actors
Chinese male film actors
Chinese male television actors
20th-century Chinese male actors
21st-century Chinese male actors